The 1976 Pot Black was a professional invitational snooker tournament, which was held in the Pebble Mill Studios in Birmingham, and featured eight professional players. All matches were one-frame shoot-outs.

Broadcasts were on BBC2 and started at 21:00 on Friday 21 May 1976  Alan Weeks presented the programme with Ted Lowe as commentator and Sydney Lee as referee.

Willie Thorne made his debut in this year's tournament against Fred Davis in the first show of the series. John Spencer won his third title beating Dennis Taylor 69-42

Main draw

Challengers League

Champions League

Knockout stage

References

Pot Black
Pot Black
Pot Black